Leopold Hoesch (born February 16, 1969 in Cologne, West Germany) is a German film producer, International Emmy Award winner and founder of the production company Broadview TV. He is Ambassador to Germany of The International Academy Of Television Arts & Sciences.

Life 
Leopold Hoesch was born and raised in Cologne, Germany. He is a fourth generation descendant of the industrialist Viktor Hoesch and grandson of Curt-Christoph von Pfuel.

Broadview TV 
In 1999, Hoesch founded the production company Broadview TV GmbH. He acts as the
executive manager. Since then, Leopold Hoesch has successfully produced many
documentary films, which have won him multiple awards.

Filmography

Series 
 Noble Dynasties in North Rhine-Westphalia
 German Dynasties
Royals
 Theatre Makers
 Theatre Portraits 
Dynasties in North Rhine-Westphalia
 TOO Young TO DIE
'UNSER LAND'

Awards and nominations won by Broadview TV 
2020 German Television Award for "Resistance Fighters" (Best Editing Info/Documentary)
2020 Nominated – German Television Award for "Resistance Fighters" (Best Documentary)
2020 Award of Excellence Special Mention: Documentary Feature at the Impact DOCS Awards for "Resistance Fighters"
2019 Impact Award at the Vancouver International Film Festival for "Resistance Fighters"
2019 Grand Prix AST – Ville de Paris at the Pariscience Film Festival for "Resistance Fighters"
2019 Nominated – German Television Award for "Coal"
2018 Nominated – German Television Award for "3 Days in September" (Best Documentary)
2017 Deutsche Akademie für Fernsehen: Award for Myrna Drews for "Hedda" (Set design)
2017 Deutscher Wirtschaftsfilmpreis for "Germany's great clans - The C&A Story"
2015 RIAS TV Award for "Breath of Freedom"
 2015 Nominated – Deutscher Filmpreis for "Nowitzki. The Perfect Shot"
2015 Nominated – Magnolia Award (Shanghai) for "Nowitzki. The Perfect Shot"
 2014 Nominated – Magnolia Award (Shanghai), Prix Europe and Rockie Award (BANFF) for "Breath of Freedom"
 2013 Bavarian TV Award for "Citizen Springer"
 2013 Nominated – Sports Emmy Award for "KLITSCHKO"
 2012 Deutscher Wirtschaftsfilmpreis Award for "Citizen Springer"
 2012 Romy Award (Austria) for "KLITSCHKO" as 'Best Documentary Cinema' and for Leopold Hoesch as 'Best Producer'
 2011 Magnolia Award (Shanghai) for "The chancellor who fell to his knees. The two lives of Willy Brandt."
 2010 Banff World Media Festival Rockie Award for "The Miracle of Leipzig"
 2010 WorldFest-Houston Gold Remi Award for "The Miracle of Leipzig"
 2009 DocumFest (Timișoara, Romania) Great Prize Award for "The Miracle of Leipzig"
 2006 Nominated – World Television Award (Banff) for "The Drama of Dresden"
 2006 Magnolia Award (Shanghai) for "The Drama of Dresden"
 2005 Nominated – World Television Award (Banff) for "The Miracle of Bern – The True Story"
 2005 International Emmy Award (New York) for "The Drama of Dresden" (together with Sebastian Dehnhardt und Guido Knopp)
 2004 Nominated – Magnolia Award (Shanghai) for "Stalingrad"
 2004 German Television Award for "The Miracle of Bern – The True Story"
 2003 Nominated – International Emmy Award for "Stalingrad"

References

External links 
 
 Website of „Broadview TV“

1969 births
German film producers
Living people
Mass media people from North Rhine-Westphalia
Film people from Cologne